Vasiliy Osipovich Bebutov (1 January 1791 – 7 April 1858) was an Imperial Russian general and a member of a Georgian-Armenian noble family of Bebutashvili/Bebutov.

Bebutov was in the military since 1809. Served in the Russo-Turkish War of 1806–1812 and the Patriotic War of 1812. Since 1816 he was Adjutant General of the H. I. M. Retinue and served with A. P. Yermolov. During the Russo-Turkish War of 1828–29 he participated in the takeover of Akhaltsikhe and commanded the defense thereof against an attempt by Ahmed Pasha of Adjara to recapture it for the Ottomans. In 1830 he was made the governor of the Armenian Oblast. From 1844–47 he fought Imam Shamil. He was awarded the Order of Saint George of the second degree on 6 December 1853 for his services after he defeated the Ottomans in the battle of Başgedikler during the Crimean War.

Honours and awards
 Order of St. Anne, 3rd class (1813), 1st class (1829)
 Order of St. Vladimir, 4th class (1819), 2nd class (1844)
 Gold Sword for Bravery (1828)
 Order of St. George, 4th class (1830), 3rd class (1846), 2nd class (1853)
 Order of the White Eagle (1847)
 Order of St. Alexander Nevsky (1849)
 Order of St. Andrew (1854)

External links
 Recipients of the Military Order of St. George: biography in Russian
 Nordisk familjebok
 Crimean War from Encyclopædia Britannica
 Old Caucasian War

1791 births
1858 deaths
Imperial Russian Army generals
Georgian generals in the Imperial Russian Army
Georgian generals with the rank "General of the Infantry" (Imperial Russia)
Armenian nobility
Russian nobility
Russian people of Armenian descent
Georgian people of Armenian descent
Nobility of Georgia (country)
Military personnel from Tbilisi
Members of the State Council (Russian Empire)
Recipients of the Order of the White Eagle (Russia)
Recipients of the Order of St. Vladimir, 2nd class
Recipients of the Order of St. George of the Second Degree
Recipients of the Order of St. George of the Third Degree
Recipients of the Order of St. Anna, 1st class
Recipients of the Gold Sword for Bravery
Russian military personnel of the Caucasian War
Burials at Armenian Pantheon of Tbilisi